was a former Japanese Nippon Professional Baseball pitcher. He played for the Yomiuri Giants from 1957 to 1969. He won 72 games in 13 seasons, winning a career high 20 games in 1965.

Career
Nakamura pitched in Nippon Professional Baseball (NPB) for the Yomiuri Giants from 1957 to 1969. He joined the team after graduating from Uji Yamada Commerce High School. His most successful season came in 1961, when he logged a 17-10 record and 2.13 ERA in 63 appearances for the Giants. In 1965, Nakamura won 20 games for the team, a career-high, recording a 2.21 ERA in 45 games. He retired as an active player following the 1969 season. He finished his career with a 72-53 record and a 2.76 ERA with 649 strikeouts in 1,242.2 innings pitched across 352 appearances.

Nakamura worked as a pitching coach for the Giants and the Chiba Lotte Marines after his playing career ended.

Personal life
Nakamura died on June 2, 2021, aged 82.

References

External links
Career statistics and player information from Baseball-Reference

1938 births
2021 deaths
People from Ise, Mie
Japanese baseball players
Yomiuri Giants players
Japanese baseball coaches
Nippon Professional Baseball coaches